Taboo is an Australian comedy factual television series which premiered on Network 10 on 30 January 2018. The program is hosted by comedian Harley Breen, who tackles sensitive subjects and concludes with a comedy routine. The host spends time with people who are disabled, terminally ill, victims of racism and those living with mental illness, turning their misfortunate, unique situations into a comedy routine experience which he performs before them and a crowd of family, friends and the public.

Taboo is produced by Lune Media and is based on a Belgian format. The pilot episode screened on 21 August 2018 and a season with three further episodes premiered on Thursday, 13 June 2019.

Episodes and Ratings

References

External links

Production website

English-language television shows
Network 10 original programming
2018 Australian television series debuts
2019 Australian television series endings
2010s Australian comedy television series